Mokhtar Al-Yamani (born 12 May 1997) is a Yemeni swimmer. He competed in the men's 100 metre freestyle event at the 2017 World Aquatics Championships. In 2018, he represented Yemen at the 2018 Asian Games held in Jakarta, Indonesia. In 2021, he competed in the men's 100 metre and 200 metre freestyle at the 2020 Summer Olympics in Tokyo, Japan.

References

External links
 

1997 births
Living people
Yemeni male freestyle swimmers
Place of birth missing (living people)
Swimmers at the 2018 Asian Games
Asian Games competitors for Yemen
Swimmers at the 2020 Summer Olympics
Olympic swimmers of Yemen
Michigan Wolverines men's swimmers